This is a list of the woredas (districts), in their zones of the Gambela Region of Ethiopia, based from materials on the Central Statistical Agency website.

References
 CSA website

Gambela Region
Gambela